The Coal-Mining (Subsidence) Act of 1950 was an Act of Parliament passed in the United Kingdom by the Labour government of Clement Attlee. It established a scheme to provide relief for residents whose dwellinghouses had been damaged by subsidence.

References

United Kingdom Acts of Parliament 1950
Coal mining in the United Kingdom
Coal mining law